Bloodrock U.S.A. is the fourth album by the Texan rock band Bloodrock, released on Capitol Records in October 1971.  The album was the first produced by the band alone without Terry Knight and the last studio album to feature original members Jim Rutledge (vocals) and Lee Pickens (lead guitar).

Track listing

Personnel
Jim Rutledge: Vocals
Lee Pickens: Vocals, Guitars
Nick Taylor: Guitars, Vocals
Stephen Hill: Keyboards, Vocals
Ed Grundy: Bass, Vocals
Rick Cobb: Drums, Percussion

Production
Arranged by Bloodrock
Produced by Bloodrock and John Palladino
Recorded and Mixed by John "Sly" Wilson
Art Direction by John Hoernle
Photography by Norman Seeff

Notes
The song "It's a Sad World" was originally performed by Israfel.
The album was reissued under One Way Records in 1998 featuring the bonus track "Erosion".

References

1971 albums
Bloodrock albums
Albums produced by Terry Knight
Capitol Records albums